Chagai  Dalbandin is the capital city of Chagai District in the Balochistan province of Pakistan. It is located at 29°18'0N 64°42'0E and has an elevation of 850 m (2791 ft). Chagai got its popularity by the nuclear program of Pakistan which was executed in Chagai District in 1998.

References

Chagai District